Mrs. World is the first beauty pageant for married women, conceived in 1984. The concept of the pageant itself has its roots in Mrs. America. From 1984 to 1987, the pageant was known as Mrs. Woman of the World and was changed to Mrs. World in 1988. The contest is the biggest marital pageant in the world.

The reigning Mrs. World 2022 is Sargam Koushal, who was crowned in the 2022 pageant that was held in December 2022 in Las Vegas, United States.

Titleholders
The following is the list of winners since its inception in 1984. No competition held in 1985, 1990 to 1994, 1996 to 1998, 2004, 2010, 2012, and 2015.

Countries by number of wins

Runners-up

Controversies

Sri Lanka Pageant Assault

In April 2021, Caroline Jurie, the reigning 2020 Mrs. World winner and former Mrs. Sri Lanka World, was the subject of global controversy after she took the crown off from the head of 2021 Mrs. Sri Lanka World winner Pushpika De Silva announcing that the winner should be married but not divorced.

Shortly after, the Mrs. World organization announced in April that Kate Schneider from Ireland, who was the first runner up when Jurie won the title, was named Mrs. World 2020 following the voluntary resignation of Caroline Jurie.

Syrian Refugee Denied Visa
Mrs. UK World 2021, Leen Clive, was due to travel to Las Vegas for the Mrs. World 2021 pageant. However, she was denied entry into the United States, believed to be due to her Syrian birth, although she had been living in the UK since 2013. Her participation was instead moved to the next pageant set for the end of 2022.

See also
 List of beauty contests
 Mrs. Universe
 Mrs. Globe

References

Further reading
 

1984 establishments in the United States
Recurring events established in 1984
Beauty pageants for married contestants
International beauty pageants